Paulino Lopes Tavares (born 10 December 1984) is a Portuguese footballer who plays as a midfielder for FC Saint-Leu 95 in the Championnat National 3.

Career
Tavares was born in Lisbon. In December 2007 he went on trial with Trelleborgs of the Swedish Allsvenskan. Following his trial he signed a two-year contract with the club. In January 2010, after his contract Trelleborgs had expired, Tavares joined Gabala FK of the Azerbaijan Premier League. Following 14 league appearances and 2 goals, Tavares left Gabala for FCM Aubervilliers in France. In October 2012, Tavares moved from Aubervilliers to ES Viry-Châtillon. He returned to Aubervilliers for the 2013–14 season before signing for US Lusitanos Saint-Maur at the sixth level of French football in July 2014. Whilst there he was part of the team that reached the Round of 64 in the Coupe de France, most notable scoring twice in a 4–3 victory against Ligue 2 side US Créteil-Lusitanos in the seventh round. After achieving promotion at the end of the season, Tavares left Saint-Maur and signed for AS Beauvais Oise in Championnat de France Amateur 2.

For the 2017–18 season, Tavares rejoined Aubervilliers for a third time.

References

External links
 
 

Living people
1984 births
Footballers from Lisbon
Association football midfielders
Portuguese footballers
Portuguese expatriate footballers
S.L. Benfica footballers
US Créteil-Lusitanos players
Levallois SC players
Trelleborgs FF players
Villemomble Sports players
Gabala FC players
ES Viry-Châtillon players
FCM Aubervilliers players
US Lusitanos Saint-Maur players
AS Beauvais Oise players
Allsvenskan players
Championnat National 2 players
Championnat National 3 players
Azerbaijan Premier League players
Portuguese expatriate sportspeople in France
Portuguese expatriate sportspeople in Sweden
Expatriate footballers in France
Expatriate footballers in Sweden
Expatriate footballers in Azerbaijan
Portuguese expatriate sportspeople in Azerbaijan